Věra Pospíšilová-Cechlová (born 19 November 1978 in Litoměřice) is a Czech athlete, competing in the discus throw and the shot put. She married Czech professional wrestler Jakub Cechl on 17 October 2003.

In August 2005 she won a bronze medal at the 2005 World Championships in Athletics. Her personal best distances are 67.71 m for the discus and 16.92 m for the shot put.

Competition record

References

External links 
 
 

1978 births
Living people
People from Litoměřice
Czech female discus throwers
Czech female shot putters
Olympic athletes of the Czech Republic
Athletes (track and field) at the 2004 Summer Olympics
Athletes (track and field) at the 2008 Summer Olympics
Athletes (track and field) at the 2012 Summer Olympics
World Athletics Championships medalists
Medalists at the 2004 Summer Olympics
Olympic bronze medalists for the Czech Republic
Sportspeople from the Ústí nad Labem Region
20th-century Czech women
21st-century Czech women